"Say Hello, Wave Goodbye" is a song from the album Non-Stop Erotic Cabaret by English synth-pop duo Soft Cell that was released as a single in January 1982 and reached number three on the UK Singles Chart.

In 1991, the track was remixed by Julian Mendelsohn and released as "Say Hello, Wave Goodbye '91" to promote the compilation album Memorabilia – The Singles, making no. 38 on the UK Singles Chart. Soft Cell vocalist Marc Almond re-recorded his vocals for the new version. It was ranked number 65 on Rolling Stone magazine's list of the 100 Best Songs of 1982  and ranked 12 on Classic Pop magazine's list of the 40 best synth-pop songs.

Music video

A promo video was made that features the British actress Eileen Daly.

Track listing
1982 7" single
"Say Hello, Wave Goodbye" - 5:24 
"Say Hello, Wave Goodbye" (Instrumental) - 5:12

1982 12" single
"Say Hello, Wave Goodbye" (Extended Version) - 9:08 
"Fun City" (Marc and the Mambas recording) - 7:45

1991 7" single
"Say Hello, Wave Goodbye '91" - 5:03 
"Memorabilia '91" - 3:56

1991 12" single
"Say Hello, Wave Goodbye '91" (The Long Goodbye - Extended Mendelsohn Remix) - 8:19 
"Memorabilia '91" (Extended Grid Remix) - 6:51

1991 CD1
"Say Hello, Wave Goodbye '91" - 5:03 
"Say Hello, Wave Goodbye '91" (The Long Goodbye - Extended Mendelsohn Remix) - 8:19
"Memorabilia '91" (Extended Grid Remix) - 6:51

1991 CD2
"Say Hello, Wave Goodbye '91" - 5:03 
"Numbers" (Original Version) - 4:57
"Torch" (Original Extended Version) - 8:27

2002 CD promo
"Say Hello, Wave Goodbye" (Almighty Radio Edit Short Version) - 3:21 
"Tainted Love" (Soulchild Mix) - 3:19
"Say Hello, Wave Goodbye" (Almighty Radio Edit) - 4:36

2017 Record Store Day 12 Inch Single Release
"Say Hello, Wave Goodbye" (Dave Ball Lateral Mix)
"Youth (Dave Ball Wasted On The Young Mix)

Cover versions
The lyrics "Take your hands off me / I don't belong to you" were used in Legião Urbana's song "Será" on their 1985 debut album.

The song was covered by English artist David Gray and released on his successful 1998 album White Ladder. It was the album's fifth proper and final single and reached #26 on the UK Singles Chart. Gray's version, like his live performances, features additional lines at the end from the Van Morrison songs "Madame George" and "Into the Mystic".  These additions contribute to a run time of 8:58, which is just under four minutes longer than the original; as such, the single featured a shorter radio edit. In addition, Gray's version omits the comma out of the title.

Marc Almond sang the song with Jools Holland's Rhythm and Blues Orchestra on the 2001 album Small World, Big Band.

Japanese duo Salon Music and American duo Sparks covered the song for Salon Music's 1988 album O Boy.

Nouvelle Vague covered the song on their 2009 album 3.

References

Songs about parting
1982 singles
2001 singles
Songs written by Marc Almond
Songs written by David Ball (electronic musician)
Soft Cell songs
David Gray (musician) songs
1981 songs
Music videos directed by Tim Pope
Song recordings produced by Julian Mendelsohn
Some Bizzare Records singles